The Mayor of West Palm Beach, Florida is a nonpartisan office that is the head of the executive branch of West Palm Beach's government. The type of government is Mayor-Commission. Powers and duties of the mayor include approving the agenda of and presiding over the meetings of the city commission, the ability to veto the city commission votes, including line-item vetoes in regards to the city budget, but vetoes can be overrode with a 4-1 vote. The mayor and city manager both have supervisory powers over the city's departments. Additionally, the mayor may initiate investigations involving the city of West Palm Beach. Since 1991, mayors have been popularly elected to four-year terms. City Hall is located at 401 Clematis Street, with the mayor's office on the second floor.

On November 6, 1894, the day after West Palm Beach was incorporated, voters elected John S. Earman as the first mayor. Beginning in 1919, the city operated under a council–manager form of government, with the mayor elected to the city commission and selected by other members of that body to serve a one-year term. The mayor served as a chairperson of the commission and had far less power than the city manager. A referendum in March 1991 resulted in a transition to a directly elected strong mayor. The first modern election for mayor occurred in November 1991, resulting in Nancy M. Graham becoming the city's first strong mayor. The current mayor is Keith James, who was elected on March 12, 2019.

Early mayors (1894-1919)

Council-manager government mayors (1919-1991)

Strong mayor (1991-present)

See also
History of West Palm Beach, Florida
Timeline of West Palm Beach, Florida
Palm Beach County, Florida

References

External links
Mayor's Page

west palm

West Palm Beach, Florida